Main Lake Provincial Park is a provincial park on Quadra Island in British Columbia, Canada. Established in 1996 as Main Lakes Chain Park and renamed and expanded in 1997, the park encompasses a large wilderness area of six lakes with many diverse animal, bird and plant species. Opportunities for visitor observation and outdoor recreation include wilderness camping, canoeing, kayaking and hiking. Main Lake, Village Bay Lake and Mine Lake are connected by narrow, shallow marshes. Clear Lake, Stramberg Lake and Little Main Lake are accessible by hiking or rough portage.

References

Provincial Parks of the Discovery Islands
Provincial parks of British Columbia
1997 establishments in British Columbia
Protected areas established in 1997